Quinconces tram stop is located on lines B, C and D of the Tramway de Bordeaux, and serves as an interchange between the three lines. The stop is located in the Place des Quinconces in the centre of the city of Bordeaux, and has four parallel platforms. Two of these serve lines C and D, which share tracks at this point, whilst the other two serve line B. The stop is operated by Transports Bordeaux Métropole.

The stop opened on 24 April 2004, when both lines B and C opened. It initially served as the terminus of both lines, until 27 July 2007, when line B was extended to Bassins à Flot, and 19 November 2007, when line C was extended to Grand-Parc. Line D first served the stop on 14 December 2019, when that line opened.

For most of the day on Mondays to Fridays, trams run at least every five minutes in both directions on both lines B and C, and every eight minutes on line D. Services run less frequently in the early morning, late evenings, weekends and public holidays.

Interchange 

The Place des Quinconces serves as a terminus for many bus lines, enabling their connections with the tramway.

 Buses of the TBC

 Bus Citram Aquitaine

Close by 
 Allées de Tourny
 Parking Tourny

References

External links 
 

Bordeaux tramway stops
Tram stops in Bordeaux
Railway stations in France opened in 2004